Abano (literally "a bath" ) is a village in north-eastern Georgia. It is located on the left bank of the Tergi in the Kazbegi Municipality, Mtskheta-Mtianeti region, 28 km from Stepantsminda town. The name literally translates as "a bath", a reference to the nearby hot springs, known as Abano Mineral Lake Natural Monument. The 17th-century combat towers survive in the village.

Sources 
 Georgian Soviet Encyclopedia, V. 1, p. 13, Tbilisi, 1975 year.

References 

Kobi Community villages